Marc Hodel (born 6 November 1970) is a retired Swiss football defender.

References

1970 births
Living people
Swiss men's footballers
FC Baden players
FC St. Gallen players
FC Zürich players
FC Aarau players
FC Sion players
Grasshopper Club Zürich players
FC Wohlen players
Switzerland international footballers
Association football defenders
Swiss football managers
Expatriate football managers in Cyprus
Swiss expatriate sportspeople in Cyprus